Shaheed Mohtarama Benazir Bhutto International Cricket Stadium is a cricket ground in Garhi Khuda Bakhsh, Sindh, Pakistan. It was inaugurated by then-President Asif Ali Zardari on 26 December 2012. The stadium was named after the late Benazir Bhutto, who served as the Prime Minister of Pakistan for two terms.

In 2013, the stadium hosted seven matches of the Faisal Bank One Day Cup, and four matches of the President's Cup One Day Tournament. It also hosted 12 matches of the Inter-Region/Department Under 19 Tournament from 2013 to 2015.

The first match played on this ground was in March 2013 when Hyderabad Hawks took on Quetta Bears.

See also
 List of stadiums by capacity
 List of stadiums in Pakistan
 List of cricket grounds in Pakistan

References

External links
Ground profile at Cricket Archive
Grouund profile at ESPNcricinfo

Cricket grounds in Pakistan
Larkana District
Stadiums in Pakistan
Multi-purpose stadiums in Pakistan
Memorials to Benazir Bhutto